Woomelang station is a closed railway station in Woomelang, Victoria, Australia. It was opened in 1899 and was closed in 1993, when passenger services discontinued on the Mildura line. Although the station is no longer in use as a passenger stop, a station building and two passenger platforms remain. A goods shed and silos also remain at this station.

References

External links
 Woomelang
 Melway map at street-directory.com.au

Disused railway stations in Victoria (Australia)